Charles Neilans DeGlopper (November 30, 1921–June 9, 1944) was a soldier of the United States Army who posthumously received the Medal of Honor, the highest award of the U.S. military, for his heroic actions and sacrifice of life during the early stages of the Battle of Normandy in World War II.

A Grand Island, New York native, DeGlopper was the only soldier from the 325th Glider Infantry Regiment to receive the Medal of Honor. He was also the only World War II soldier from the 82nd Airborne Division of the U.S. Army to receive the award for action during the Normandy Campaign.

82nd Airborne Division Service
Charles N. DeGlopper entered the United States Army in November 1942. He trained at Camp Croft, South Carolina. He was deployed overseas in April 1943, where he served in North Africa, Sicily, Italy and France. He was ultimately killed in action on June 9, 1944 in La Fière, Manche, Normandy, France.

Medal of Honor Action
In the late evening of June 6, 1944, the 82nd Airborne's glider troops began to arrive in France staged from Aldermaston airfield, each involving hundreds of CG-4 Waco and Airspeed Horsa gliders and managed in code-named phases denoted: Mission Keokuk, Mission Elmira, and the final two glider landings were scheduled for June 7, 1944 during the morning hours in Missions Galveston and Hackensack which brought in the 325th Glider Infantry Regiment (325th GIR). Mission Galveston arrived in two serials of fifty gliders each and while the first had something of a disastrous landing, the second fared slightly better, but less than 50% of their equipment was recoverable. Mission Hackensack, the last to arrive, brought in the remaining 1,300 glidermen of the 325th GIR and their equipment. Also arriving in two serials, the gliders began landing on the 7th at 0900 in broad daylight. Despite the apparent destruction on the ground, the operation was a great success with most of the troops and nearly all of their equipment getting delivered to the battlefield. Nearly 90% of the 325th GIR's men were assembled within a few hours of landing and moved towards Chef-du-Pont.

Leading his troops, regimental commander Colonel Harry Lewis was ordered to make a crossing of the le Merderet River and help attack La Fière Bridge from the opposite side. Seeing a small fording area across the river, Col. Lewis sent his 1st Battalion to wade across under cover of darkness; their objective was to attack the force defending the bridge. Themselves under attack, C Company 1st Battalion was cut off from the rest of the battalion and despite himself coming under increased fire, Private First Class Charles DeGlopper stood up and began to fire his Browning Automatic Rifle at the attacking Germans in an attempt to suppress their fire and relieve the battalion.

Although wounded, PFC DeGlopper continued to stand and fire, and when hit yet again, still fired although kneeling and bleeding profusely. Meanwhile, as the Germans were distracted and occupied with PFC DeGlopper's automatic fire, the remainder of C Company was able to break off and head for La Fière to join the rest of their battalion.

For his self-sacrificial actions, Private First Class Charles DeGlopper posthumously received the Medal of Honor on February 28, 1946, the only member of the 82nd Airborne Division so honored in Normandy.

Medal of Honor Citation
The President of the United States, in the name of The Congress, takes pleasure in presenting the Medal of Honor to

for service as set forth in the following CITATION:

He was a member of Company C, 325th Glider Infantry, on 9 June 1944 advancing with the forward platoon to secure a bridgehead across the Merderet River at La Fière, France. At dawn the platoon had penetrated an outer line of machineguns and riflemen, but in so doing had become cut off from the rest of the company. Vastly superior forces began a decimation of the stricken unit and put in motion a flanking maneuver which would have completely exposed the American platoon in a shallow roadside ditch where it had taken cover. Detecting this danger, Pfc. DeGlopper volunteered to support his comrades by fire from his automatic rifle while they attempted a withdrawal through a break in a hedgerow 40 yards to the rear. Scorning a concentration of enemy automatic weapons and rifle fire, he walked from the ditch onto the road in full view of the Germans, and sprayed the hostile positions with assault fire. He was wounded, but he continued firing. Struck again, he started to fall; and yet his grim determination and valiant fighting spirit could not be broken. Kneeling in the roadway, weakened by his grievous wounds, he leveled his heavy weapon against the enemy and fired burst after burst until killed outright. He was successful in drawing the enemy action away from his fellow soldiers, who continued the fight from a more advantageous position and established the first bridgehead over the Merderet. In the area where he made his intrepid stand his comrades later found the ground strewn with dead Germans and many machineguns and automatic weapons which he had knocked out of action. Pfc. DeGlopper's gallant sacrifice and unflinching heroism while facing insurmountable odds were in great measure responsible for a highly important tactical victory in the Normandy Campaign.

Rank and organization: Private First Class, U.S. Army, Co. C, 325th Glider Infantry, 82d Airborne Division. 
Place and date: Merderet River at la Fiere, France, June 9, 1944. 
Entered service at: Grand Island, N.Y. 
Birth: Grand Island, N.Y. 
G.O. No.: 22, February 28, 1946.

Military Awards 
DeGlopper's military decorations and awards include:

Charles N. DeGlopper Remembrance Day
On June 9, 2002, on the island community of Grand Island, New York, the Charles DeGlopper VFW (Veterans of Foreign Wars) Post #9249 dedicated a new headstone on the grave of the island's native son, Charles N. DeGlopper, C Company, 325th Glider Infantry. The new marker recognizes the fact that Charles DeGlopper was awarded the Medal of Honor after his death during the Normandy invasion.

Timeline

Born: November 30, 1921 to Mary Neilans DeGlopper and Charles Leonard DeGlopper
Family Home: 2176 Fix Road, Grand Island, New York
Attended Elementary School at School #5, Baseline and Bush roads, Grand Island
June 1941: Graduated from Tonawanda High School
Entered the Army in November, 1942
Trained at Camp Croft, South Carolina
Sent overseas, April 1943
Served in North Africa, Sicily, Italy and France
Killed in action: June 9, 1944 - La La Fière, France
February 28, 1945: Recommended for the Medal of Honor by Captain Wayne W. Pierce, 325th Glider Infantry, Commanding Company C
March 10, 1946: Charles N. DeGlopper is posthumously awarded the Medal of Honor, the highest award bestowed on any member of the Army. Medal presented to his father, Charles L. DeGlopper by Major General Leland S. Hobbs at a ceremony at Trinity Evangelical United Brethren Church, Whitehaven Road, Grand Island.

December 3, 1947: US Army Transport "Elgin Victory" is renamed the "Pvt. Charles N. DeGlopper" at the Brooklyn Army Base at Brooklyn, New York. Following the ceremony, the ship left for Bremerhaven, Germany with arrival expected on December 17, 1947. The 7,607-ton vessel was built in 1945 in California.
April 5, 1948: Road at Fort Bragg, North Carolina named for Charles N. DeGlopper
July 7, 1948: Charles N. DeGlopper's body is returned from France to the Buffalo Central Terminal, Buffalo, New York. Traveled the six miles from the terminal to the Connecticut Street Armory by caisson.
July 8–9, 1948: Charles N. DeGlopper's body, along with two others, lies in state at the Connecticut Street Armory.
July 9, 1948: Evening wake is held in the family home on Fix Road.
July 10, 1948: Funeral from family home. Service read by Rev. J. Franklin Beck, Trinity Evangelical United Brethren Church. Charles N DeGlopper buried in Maple Grove Cemetery, Whitehaven Road, Grand Island (actually on Stony Pt.) Military rites conducted by Grand Island Post 1346, American Legion.

December 7, 1958: US Army Reserve Training Center, Colvin Blvd., Tonawanda, New York is dedicated to Charles N. DeGlopper and named the Charles DeGlopper Center. It is a 600-person armory costing approx. $500,000.
May, 1962: American Legion Post 1346 appropriates and dedicates Charles DeGlopper Park, Baseline Road and Grand Island Boulevard, Grand Island, New York Garden Club, who continue today to maintain it. First services held for Memorial Day 1962.
November 1965: Charles N. DeGlopper Memorial VFW Post #9249 named for Charles N. DeGlopper
October 1992: Grand Island Historical Society World War II Display for the Huth Road Elementary School Fourth Graders. This was the first public display of Charles N. DeGlopper's Medal of Honor
June 9, 1994: 50th Anniversary of Charles N. DeGlopper's Death
June 9–11, 1994: Ceremonies at Maple Grove Cemetery and DeGlopper Park, Skydivers and a Presentation of Flags at Veterans Park, Display of Memorabilia, Vehicles and Artifacts at Historic Trinity Church, all on Grand Island Organized by the Niagara Frontier All Airborne Chapter, 82nd Airborne, Grand Island Historical Society, Town of Grand Island
June 12, 2004: Ceremonies at Maple Grove Cemetery commemorating his life and sacrifice 2:00 PM on Saturday, June 12, 2004.
June 4, 2010: Annual Ceremony at the Charles DeGlopper Memorial Panel at La Fiere, Normandy (France). (For more information on the annual ceremony contact Vivian Roger at http://www.lafiere.com )
2014 The Fort Bragg Air Assault School formally renamed The DeGlopper Air Assault School after Charles N. DeGlopper

Cultural References
The novel March Upcountry contains a fictional space ship, the Charles DeGlopper, in honor of Charles N. DeGlopper.

The physical training field between the barracks of 1st and 2nd Battalions of the 325th Airborne Infantry Regiment (the modern-day descendant of the Glider Infantry Regiment) is named DeGlopper Field

Charles DeGlopper's sacrifice is also mentioned in the D-Day episode of the TV documentary, "Road to Victory" (2011), narrated by historian Ellwood von Seibold.

See also

List of Medal of Honor recipients
List of Medal of Honor recipients for World War II

Notes

References

External links

1921 births
1944 deaths
United States Army personnel killed in World War II
United States Army Medal of Honor recipients
United States Army soldiers
People from Grand Island, New York
World War II recipients of the Medal of Honor
Battle of Normandy recipients of the Medal of Honor
United States Army personnel of World War II
Military personnel from New York (state)